James Robert Durrant  is a professor of Photochemistry in the faculty of Natural Sciences, department of Chemistry at Imperial College London and Sêr Cymru Solar Professor in the college of engineering at Swansea University. He serves as director of the centre for plastic electronics (CPE).

Education
Durrant was educated at Gresham's School in Norfolk, the University of Cambridge and Imperial College London, where he was awarded a PhD in 1991 for research on photosystem II using spectroscopy supervised by George Porter and Jim Barber.

Career and research
Durrant's research focuses on a range of photochemical applications including solar cells, solar fuel production and photocatalysis, nanomaterials and plastic electronics. Durrant has authored over 400 publications, focusing on the charge carrier kinetics which determine materials and device function. 

Durrant teaches physical chemistry at Imperial College London and is involved in the SPECIFIC Innovation and Knowledge Centre (IKC) at Swansea University.

Honours and awards
Durrant was appointed Commander of the Order of the British Empire (CBE) in the 2022 Birthday Honours for services to photochemistry and solar energy research.

2018: Awarded Hughes Medal by the Royal Society
2017: Elected a Fellow of the Royal Society (FRS) for his research contributions in photochemistry of new materials for use in solar energy conversion – specifically targeting both solar cells in photovoltaic systems and solar to fuel in artificial photosynthesis. 
2016: Awarded president's award for excellence in research supervision.
2012: Awarded the Tilden Prize by the Royal Society of Chemistry
2009: Awarded the Environment Prize by the Royal Society of Chemistry
1994: Awarded the Meldola Medal and Prize by the Royal Society of Chemistry

References

Year of birth missing (living people)
Living people
Photochemists
People educated at Gresham's School
Academics of Imperial College London
Academics of Swansea University
Fellows of the Royal Society
Commanders of the Order of the British Empire
20th-century British chemists
21st-century British chemists
Alumni of the University of Cambridge
Alumni of Imperial College London